Ponometia pulchra is a species of bird-dropping moth in the family Noctuidae. It was first described by William Barnes and James Halliday McDunnough in 1910 and it is found in North America.

The MONA or Hodges number for Ponometia pulchra is 9104.

References

Further reading

 
 
 

Acontiinae
Articles created by Qbugbot
Moths described in 1910